Mikhaylovskoye is a rural locality (a selo) and the administrative center of Mikhaylovsky District of Altai Krai, Russia. Population:

References

Notes

Sources

Rural localities in Mikhaylovsky District, Altai Krai